Acalymma vittatum, the striped cucumber beetle, is a beetle of the family Chrysomelidae and a serious pest of cucurbit crops in both larval and adult stages. It is distributed from eastern North America to the Rocky Mountains. It is replaced in the west by Acalymma trivittatum, a duller species often with greyish or pale white elytra rather than yellow.

Description
The striped cucumber beetle is a small beetle approximately half a centimeter (1/5 inch) in length, and characterized by brown-yellow elytra completely covering the abdomen and longitudinally transversed by three thick black stripes.  It superficially resembles the western corn rootworm (Diabrotica virgifera), another serious crop pest.  However, the ventral abdominal surface of A. vittatum is black where that of D. virgifera are yellow, and the elytra of D. virgifera often do not extend the full length of the abdomen.

Life cycle
Large numbers of adults emerge from diapause in the spring to feed on the foliage, flowers, and pollen of cucurbit species.  Between one and two generations of beetles can pass in a season depending on the region, with the final generation settling into another period of diapause to wait out the winter.

Females will lay eggs on or in the immediate vicinity of the stem of a viable host plant, often a member of the genus Cucurbita.  Eggs are a bright orange color and less than a millimeter in diameter.  Eggs hatch after a short period and larvae feed on the roots of the plant.

Agricultural damage

Striped cucumber beetles can cause significant amounts of foliar damage to cucurbit crops, particularly to older plants, and larval root feeding also damages the plant.  The most damage is often seen in the early part of the year during the emergence of overwintering beetles, but feeding damage continues throughout the entire growing season.  Furthermore, adult beetles are one of two known vectors of the bacterial wilt Erwinia tracheiphila, an incurable and often fatal disease of cucurbits.  Bacteria passes from the frass of the beetle into feeding wounds that reach into the vascular tissues of the plants, where they proliferate to the point of blocking the xylem.

Chemical attractants
In Massachusetts, A. vittatum are attracted by several chemicals emitted by cucurbits, including 1,2,4-trimethoxybenzene and indole, though not (E)-cinnamaldehyde. In Illinois, A. vittatum was found to be attracted to indole and (E)-cinnamaldehyde, but not 1,2,4-trimethoxybenzene.

Control techniques
Grower tolerance for this beetle is very low, due in major part to the transmission of bacterial wilt.  Unfortunately, effective control techniques beyond pesticides are few and far between.  Research into nematode and other biological control agents continues today. Another possibility is the planting of trap crops (crops that the beetles prefer) around the perimeter of the main crop. The trap crop can then be treated with insecticide, reducing overall pesticide use.

Some research indicates that striped cucumber beetle damage can be reduced by the use of vermicompost fertilizer compared to inorganic fertilizer. Researchers suggest that the mechanism by which vermicompost reduces beetle damage is due to an increase in phenolic compounds in plants grown with vermicompost.

The application of Paecilomyces fumosoroseus to a trap crop is an effective means of controlling the beetle.

Cucumber beetles and cucurbitacin
Acalymma vittatum, along with other cucurbit-feeding beetles in the genus Diabrotica, are induced to feeding behavior by a class of plant secondary compounds called cucurbitacins, widespread in members of the family Cucurbitaceae.  These extremely bitter chemicals are hypothesized to have evolved as a plant feeding defense, but have been co-opted by the beetles into a kairomonal feeding attractant.  Beetles are capable of consuming amounts of cucurbitacins that would kill other organisms, and some work has indicated that the beetle may sequester the compounds in their elytra to deter predation.

References

Galerucinae
Beetles of North America
Taxa named by Johan Christian Fabricius
Beetles described in 1775
Agricultural pest insects